Blain may refer to:

People
Blain Morin (born 1960), Canadian politician
Blain (surname)

Places
Blain, Pennsylvania, U.S.
Blaine Township, Washington County, Pennsylvania, U.S.
Electoral division of Blain, Northern Territory, Australia
Blain, Loire-Atlantique, France

Other
Blain (animal disease), an eighteenth-century term for an animal disease involving a swelling on the root of the tongue
Bláin, another name for the Norse giant Ymir
Chilblains, a medical condition similar to frostbite

See also
Blaine (disambiguation)